Ruben Rafkin (born 8 January 2002) is a Finnish professional ice hockey defenceman for HC TPS of the Finnish Liiga.

Playing career
Rafkin was drafted 14th overall by the Windsor Spitfires in the 2019 CHL Import Draft. He recorded four goals and 27 assists in 59 games for the Spitfires. On April 3, 2020, Rafkin signed a two-year contract with HC TPS of the Finnish Liiga. He made his professional debut for TPS during the 2020–21 season.

International play

Rafkin represented Finland at the 2021 World Junior Ice Hockey Championships where he appeared in one game and won a bronze medal.  He will again represent Finland at the 2022 World Junior Ice Hockey Championships.

Career statistics

Regular season and playoffs

International

References

External links
 

2002 births
Living people
Finnish ice hockey defencemen
HC TPS players
Sportspeople from Turku
Finnish people of Russian-Jewish descent
Tri-City Storm players
Windsor Spitfires players
Finnish expatriate ice hockey players in Canada
Finnish expatriate ice hockey players in the United States